Tyler Paul Zeller (born January 17, 1990) is an American former professional basketball player. He played college basketball at the University of North Carolina, where as a freshman he played on their 2009 national championship team and as a senior was an All-American and the Atlantic Coast Conference Player of the Year. He is the nephew of former NBA player Al Eberhard, and the brother of fellow NBA players Cody Zeller and Luke Zeller.

High school career
Born in Visalia, California, Tyler Zeller grew up in Washington, Indiana, attending Washington High School. In his four years at Washington High, his team won four sectional titles, as well as state Class 3A championships in his freshman and senior years (2005 and 2008). In his senior year, he averaged 33.1 points and 11.0 rebounds per game, and also shot 69% from the field and 82% from the free throw line. In his final high school game, the '08 Class 3A final against Fort Wayne Harding, he scored 47 points, which broke a record for scoring by a player in an Indiana boys' state championship game that had stood since 1970. He was not only a basketball superstar, but also played on Washington High's tennis team for three years, and finished his high school career with a 3.99 grade point average on a 4.0 scale, good for third in his graduating class. After the 2008 season, he was named "Mr. Basketball" in Indiana, the state's highest honor for high school players. He received the title three years after his brother Luke and three years before his brother Cody were honored with the same award.  He was also named a McDonald's All-American, as well as a first-team Parade All-American.

During the early stages of the signing period in November 2007, Zeller signed a letter of intent to play at North Carolina. When the university announced his signing, Tar Heels head coach Roy Williams said about Zeller, "I think he is the finest running big man in the country and he has a tremendous shooting touch to go with that ability to run the floor." Zeller notably exhibited that shooting touch at a high school all-star game during the 2008 Kentucky Derby Festival, at which he won the event's three-point shooting contest.

Considered a four-star recruit by Rivals.com, Zeller was listed as the No. 7 center and the No. 33 player in the nation in 2008.

College career
Zeller started the first two games of the 2008–09 season in place of the previous season's consensus national Player of the Year, Tyler Hansbrough, who was sidelined with a stress reaction in his right shin. In his first game, he scored 18 points in Carolina's season-opening win over Penn.

The Tar Heels' next game, on November 18, was against another equally storied team, Kentucky. The Heels scored a surprisingly easy 77–58 win over the Wildcats, but suffered another injury blow, this time involving Zeller. With 1:26 left in the game, Zeller went for a breakaway dunk off a turnover, but was fouled by Kentucky's Ramon Harris before he could score. Zeller fell to the floor awkwardly, got up, and was taken to the locker room holding his left wrist.

X-rays showed that Zeller had broken both of the major bones in his lower left arm (the radius and ulna). The day after the injury, he had surgery at UNC Hospitals to repair the broken bones.  In early January 2009, Zeller's cast was removed.

Zeller made his return during his freshman season on February 18, 2009, in the Tar Heels' home game against North Carolina State, playing 8 minutes and scoring 2 points.

As a sophomore, Zeller averaged 9.3 points per game on 52.1% shooting and 4.6 rebounds per game in limited action off the bench.

Zeller averaged 15.7 points per game during his junior year. He shot 54.7% and averaged 7.2 rebounds per game. He had a more active role, playing an average of 28.1 minutes per game, significantly more than the 17.4 minutes per game during his sophomore campaign.

Zeller averaged 16.5 points per game on 55.3% shooting during his senior season. He also played an average of 28.2 minutes per game.

Zeller was voted to the All-ACC First Team his senior year and was named the ACC Player of the Year.  Zeller was also named a second team all American by the Sporting News and the USBWA as a senior.  Both accolades made him eligible to have his jersey honored in the rafters of the Smith Center at the conclusion of his college career.

Professional career

Cleveland Cavaliers (2012–2014)
Zeller announced that he was entering the 2012 NBA draft along with North Carolina teammates Harrison Barnes, Kendall Marshall and John Henson. He was selected by the Dallas Mavericks with the 17th pick in the draft, and was the fourth Tar Heel to be selected in the first round. He was subsequently traded to the Cleveland Cavaliers on draft night, and signed his rookie scale contract with the Cavaliers on July 5, 2012.

On October 11, 2013, Zeller underwent an emergency appendectomy procedure to remove his appendix and was subsequently ruled out indefinitely. He recovered from the surgery in time to face the Brooklyn Nets in the team's 2013–14 season opener on October 30.

On March 22, 2014, Zeller scored a then career-high 23 points in a 118–111 loss to the Houston Rockets.

Boston Celtics (2014–2017)
On July 10, 2014, Zeller was traded to the Boston Celtics in a three-team trade that also involved the Cavaliers and the Brooklyn Nets. On December 5, 2014, he scored a then career-high 24 points on 10-of-11 shooting in a 113–96 win over the Los Angeles Lakers. He set a new career high on March 16, 2015 against the Philadelphia 76ers, scoring 26 points on 11-of-15 shooting to help the Celtics defeat the 76ers, 108–89.

Zeller started the 2015–16 season as the Celtics' starting center, but moved to the bench after just three games. Over the Celtics' first 25 games of the season, Zeller logged nine DNPs. On December 16, he scored a season-high 12 points in a loss to the Detroit Pistons, hitting 5-of-7 from the field in less than ten minutes. Zeller began to see increased minutes in early February, recording two 16-point games on February 2 against the New York Knicks, and on February 5 against the Cleveland Cavaliers, both wins. On February 7, he again set a season high, scoring 17 points in a 128–119 win over the Sacramento Kings. On April 8, he tied a career high with 26 points in a 124–109 win over the Milwaukee Bucks.

On June 29, 2016, the Celtics tendered a qualifying offer to make Zeller a restricted free agent. He went on to re-sign with the Celtics on July 27, 2016. On July 2, 2017, he was waived by the Celtics.

Brooklyn Nets (2017–2018)
On September 12, 2017, Zeller signed a multi-year contract with the Brooklyn Nets.

Milwaukee Bucks (2018)
On February 5, 2018, Zeller was traded to the Milwaukee Bucks in exchange for Rashad Vaughn and the rights to a future second-round draft pick. On October 13, 2018, he was waived by the Bucks.

Atlanta Hawks (2019)
On March 7, 2019, Zeller signed a 10-day contract with the Atlanta Hawks. He was not retained by the Hawks upon the expiration of the 10-day contract.

Memphis Grizzlies (2019)
On April 5, 2019, Zeller signed with the Memphis Grizzlies for the remainder of the season.

San Antonio Spurs (2020) 
On September 28, 2019, the Denver Nuggets had announced that Zeller had joined for training camp. On October 18, 2019 the Nuggets waived Zeller.

On June 24, 2020, the San Antonio Spurs signed Zeller to their roster to complete the 2019–20 season following the restart of league play coming out of the COVID-19 pandemic. On December 2, Zeller was included in training camp roster with the Spurs, but was later waived by the San Antonio Spurs on December 19.

Career statistics

NBA

Regular season

|-
| style="text-align:left;"| 
| style="text-align:left;"| Cleveland
| 77|| 55 || 26.4 || .438 || .000 || .764 || 5.7 || 1.2 || .5 || .9 || 7.9
|-
| style="text-align:left;"| 
| style="text-align:left;"| Cleveland
| 70 || 9 || 15.0 || .538 || .000 || .719 || 4.0 || .5 || .3 || .5 || 5.7
|- 
| style= "text-align:left;"| 
| style= "text-align:left;"| Boston
| 82 || 59 || 21.1 || .549 || – || .823 || 5.7 || 1.4 || .2 || .6 || 10.2 
|- 
| style= "text-align:left;"| 
| style= "text-align:left;"| Boston
| 60 || 3 || 11.8 || .476 || – || .815 || 3.0 || .5 || .2 || .4 || 6.1
|- 
| style= "text-align:left;"| 
| style= "text-align:left;"| Boston
| 51 || 5 || 10.3 || .494 || .000 || .564 || 2.4 || .8 || .1 || .4 || 3.5
|- 
| style= "text-align:left;"| 
| style= "text-align:left;"| Brooklyn
| 42 || 33 || 16.7 || .546 || .385 || .667 || 4.6 || .7 || .2 || .5 || 7.1
|- 
| style= "text-align:left;"| 
| style= "text-align:left;"| Milwaukee
| 24 || 1 || 16.9 || .590 || .000 || .895 || 4.6 || .8 || .3 || .6 || 5.9
|- 
| style= "text-align:left;"| 
| style= "text-align:left;"| Atlanta
| 2 || 0 || 5.5 || .000 || .000 || - || 3.0 || .5 || .0 || .0 || 0.0
|- 
| style= "text-align:left;"| 
| style= "text-align:left;"| Memphis
| 4 || 1 || 20.5 || .571 || - || .778 || 4.5 || .8 || .3 || .8 || 11.5
|- 
| style= "text-align:left;"| 
| style= "text-align:left;"| San Antonio
| 2 || 0 || 2.0 || .250 || - || - || 2.0 || .0 || .0 || .0 || 1.0
|- class="sortbottom"
| style="text-align:center;" colspan="2"| Career
| 414 || 166 || 17.5 || .508 || .286 || .764 || 4.4 || .9 || .3 || .6 || 6.9

Playoffs

|-
| style="text-align:left;"| 2015
| style="text-align:left;"| Boston
| 4 || 4 || 22.5 || .517 || – || .800 || 4.5 || .5 || .5 || .3 || 8.5
|-
| style="text-align:left;"| 2016
| style="text-align:left;"| Boston
| 3 || 0 || 12.7 || .467 || – || .667 || 5.0 || .7 || .0 || .7 || 6.0
|-
| style="text-align:left;"| 2017
| style="text-align:left;"| Boston
| 11 || 0 || 7.1 || .520 || – || .750 || 1.7 || .7 || .0 || .2 || 2.9
|-
| style="text-align:left;"| 2018
| style="text-align:left;"| Milwaukee
| 7 || 3 || 9.4 || .800 || – || .750 || 2.0 || .4 || .6 || .4 || 1.6
|- class="sortbottom"
| style="text-align:center;" colspan="2"| Career
| 25 || 7 || 10.9 || .527 || – || .739 || 2.6 || .6 || .2 || .3 || 3.8

College

|-
| style="text-align:left;"| 2008–09
| style="text-align:left;"| North Carolina
| 15 || 2 || 7.8 || .472 || – || .765 || 2.0 || .2 || .2 || .2 || 3.1 
|-
| style="text-align:left;"| 2009–10
| style="text-align:left;"| North Carolina
| 27 || 0 || 17.3 || .521 || .0 || .722 || 4.6 || .3 || .5 || .9 || 9.3 
|-
| style="text-align:left;"| 2010–11
| style="text-align:left;"| North Carolina
| 37 || 35 || 28.1 || .549 || – || .759 || 7.2 || .6 || .7 || 1.2 || 15.8 
|-
| style="text-align:left;"| 2011–12
| style="text-align:left;"| North Carolina
| 38 || 38 || 28.2 || .553 || – || .808 || 9.6 || .9 || .9 || 1.5 || 16.3
|- class="sortbottom"
| style="text-align:center;" colspan="2"| Career
| 117 || 75 || 23.0 || .543 || .0 || .775 || 6.7 || .6 || .7 || 1.1 || 12.8

References

External links

North Carolina Tar Heels bio

1990 births
Living people
All-American college men's basketball players
American men's basketball players
Atlanta Hawks players
Basketball players from Indiana
Boston Celtics players
Brooklyn Nets players
Centers (basketball)
Cleveland Cavaliers players
Dallas Mavericks draft picks
McDonald's High School All-Americans
Memphis Grizzlies players
Milwaukee Bucks players
North Carolina Tar Heels men's basketball players
Parade High School All-Americans (boys' basketball)
People from Washington, Indiana
Power forwards (basketball)
San Antonio Spurs players
Sportspeople from Visalia, California
United States men's national basketball team players